Gastón Eduardo Montero (born 23 March 1986) is an Argentine professional footballer who plays as a left-back for Almirante Brown].

Career
Montero started his career with Primera División side Vélez Sarsfield. After five top-flight appearances for the club, Montero moved across the division in 2008 to Gimnasia y Esgrima. He participated in five fixtures in both the 2007–08 and 2008–09 campaigns. Montero departed midway through the latter, signing for Los Andes of Primera B Nacional. He scored on his debut for them, netting in a 3–2 victory over Defensa y Justicia on 13 February 2009. A further goal against Instituto arrived in eighteen total appearances. Montero split his time in 2009–10 with San Martín namesakes from San Juan and San Miguel de Tucumán.

After spending twelve months with Platense in Primera B Metropolitana, Montero completed a move to Estudiantes on 13 July 2011. His first goal for them came in a 1–1 draw on 14 October 2012 with Brown, a fixture that also saw him sent off in stoppage time. Deportivo Morón became Montero's eighth team in mid-2014, though the defender would depart in the succeeding January to fellow third tier outfit Deportivo Riestra. Eighty-seven matches and three goals came across 2015, 2016 and 2016–17, with the latter concluding with promotion via the play-offs; though they were subsequently relegated back after one season.

After one hundred and fifty-one appearances and four goals in five years with Riestra, Montero departed in August 2020 to Almirante Brown; reuniting with Jorge Benítez, who managed Montero at Riestra between July 2016 and September 2018.

Career statistics
.

References

External links

1986 births
Living people
Footballers from Buenos Aires
Argentine footballers
Association football defenders
Argentine Primera División players
Primera Nacional players
Primera B Metropolitana players
Club Atlético Vélez Sarsfield footballers
Gimnasia y Esgrima de Jujuy footballers
Club Atlético Los Andes footballers
San Martín de San Juan footballers
San Martín de Tucumán footballers
Club Atlético Platense footballers
Estudiantes de Buenos Aires footballers
Deportivo Morón footballers
Deportivo Riestra players
Club Almirante Brown footballers